Boris Banga (born 9 August 1949) is a Swiss politician and longtime mayor of Grenchen (1991–2013). Banga is a member of the Social Democratic Party of Switzerland.

References

External links
 

1949 births
Living people
Politicians from Basel-Stadt
Social Democratic Party of Switzerland politicians
Members of the National Council (Switzerland)